Nectandra aurea is a species of plant in the family Lauraceae. It is endemic to Venezuela.

References

aurea
Endemic flora of Venezuela
Near threatened flora of South America
Taxonomy articles created by Polbot